George Chesser (September 11, 1942 – November 12, 2008) was an American football running back and punter. He played for the Miami Dolphins from 1966 to 1967.

References

1942 births
2008 deaths
American football running backs
American football punters
Ole Miss Rebels football players
Delta State Statesmen football players
Miami Dolphins players